Federrico is a Venezuelan sitcom produced in 1982, starring Carlos Villagrán, Ramón Valdés, Simón García, Maribel Ponte and Nancy Soto. A spin-off of the series was produced in 1983 under the name Las nuevas aventuras de Federrico ("The new adventures of Federrico"). The Villagrán character was almost identical to Quico, which was his character on El Chavo series, the only change being the name, due to an ongoing dispute with Chespirito over the character, a pattern repeated with other former Chespirito cast members such as Rubén Aguirre and María Antonieta de las Nieves. Also, Valdéz's character Don Moncho is identical to El Chavo'''s Don Ramón.

Plot

The series has a very simple plot: Federrico gets involved on funny adventures on the school or with his friends. Many times he drives mad his neighbor, Don Moncho, and his mother, Doña Carlota''. Federrico is also in love with his teacher, a very beautiful lady.

1980s sitcoms
1980s children's television series
Venezuelan comedy television series
RCTV original programming
1982 Venezuelan television series debuts